Harrison Reed (born January 18, 1988) is a Canadian professional ice hockey right winger who is currently playing for Hamburg Crocodiles in the Oberliga (Ger.3). In his career, he played 208 games in the AHL and 50 games in Deutsche Eishockey Liga.

Playing career
Reed was drafted 93rd overall in the 2006 NHL Entry Draft by the Carolina Hurricanes. Reed played major junior hockey in the Ontario Hockey League with the London Knights, Sarnia Sting and Guelph Storm. After his final year of eligibility with the Storm in 2007–08, Harrison signed with the Hurricanes to a three-year entry level contract on May 22, 2008.

Reed was assigned to AHL affiliate, the Albany River Rats for his first professional season in 2008–09. He played in 70 games scoring 9 points with the Rats and also played a solitary game with ECHL affiliate, the Florida Everblades.

Harrison started the 2009–10 season with the River Rats, along with a brief stint with the Everblades, before he was traded by the Hurricanes with Stephane Yelle to the Colorado Avalanche for Cedric Lalonde-McNicoll and a sixth-round draft pick on March 3, 2010. He was then assigned to Avalanche affiliate, the Lake Erie Monsters, for the remainder of the season.

On September 1, 2011, it was announced that Reed signed a contract with the Toledo Walleye of the ECHL. In the 2011–12 season, Reed scored a respectable 33 points in 52 games with the Walleye, earning two AHL try-out contracts with former team, the Lake Erie Monsters and the Houston Aeros.

A free agent, on September 5, 2012, Reed signed a one-year contract to remain in the ECHL with the Stockton Thunder. As a top line scoring threat for the Thunder, Reed produced at a point-per-game pace, with helped the Thunder reach the Kelly Cup finals. During the course of the 2012–13 season, Reed was loaned for his third stint with the Lake Erie Monsters appearing in 14 games for 2 points.

On July 31, 2013, Reed was signed to his first European contract, agreeing to a one-year deal with German club, Eispiraten Crimmitschau of the DEL2. In the inaugural season of the DEL2, Reed excelled offensively accounting for the majority of the Pirates offense, to lead the league with 40 goals and 90 points in 54 games. Despite his output he was unable to lift Crimmitschau from last position in the regular season, but he scored 27 points in 17 post-season games to ensure safety from relegation. He was selected as the DEL2 Forward of the Year for his efforts.

On April 24, 2014, Reed accepted a contract offer from DEL club Straubing Tigers for the following 2014-15 season. In the 2014–15 DEL season, he was the second leading scorer on his team, tallying 25 points.

For the 2015-16 season, Reed signed a contract with the DEL2 outfit Dresdner Eislöwen. There he played alongside Max Campbell like in the successful time with Eispiraten Crimmitschau. Reed scored 28 goals to go along with 26 assists in 67 DEL2 contests for the Eislöwen squad that season. He left Germany at the conclusion of the 2015-16 campaign to continue his career in the neighbouring country of Denmark, joining Metal Ligaen outfit SønderjyskE.

Career statistics

References

External links

1988 births
Albany River Rats players
Carolina Hurricanes draft picks
Canadian ice hockey right wingers
Dresdner Eislöwen players
ETC Crimmitschau players
Florida Everblades players
Guelph Storm players
Houston Aeros (1994–2013) players
Lake Erie Monsters players
Living people
London Knights players
Sarnia Sting players
Stavanger Oilers players
Stockton Thunder players
Straubing Tigers players
SønderjyskE Ishockey players
Toledo Walleye players
Tulsa Oilers (1992–present) players
Canadian expatriate ice hockey players in Denmark
Canadian expatriate ice hockey players in Norway
Canadian expatriate ice hockey players in Germany
Canadian expatriate ice hockey players in the United States